Rokietnica  is a village in Poznań County, Greater Poland Voivodeship, in west-central Poland. It is the seat of the gmina (administrative district) called Gmina Rokietnica.

The village has a population of 1,900.

Notable residents
 Georg von Hantelmann (1898-1924), World War I pilot

References

Villages in Poznań County